Education in Malawi stresses academic preparation leading to access to secondary school and universities. However, few students go on to high school or university. The dropout rate is also very high particularly among primary school pupils.

Primary education
Primarily schools are mostly in two categories of assisted (public) and unassisted (private) schools. Villages and hamlets throughout the country have such schools. By 1970, there were approximately 2,000 primary schools for 35 percent of primary school aged youth. About 12 percent of all primary school students attended private, predominantly church run schools.

Secondary school education
Secondary education developed late in Malawi, because of little effort or neglect in secondary education during the colonial era. Malawi has five types of secondary schools. These include aided boarding schools, aided day schools, government boarding-secondary schools, government day secondary schools, and private secondary schools. Most secondary teachers are qualified and hold either degrees or diplomas.

In the curriculum, Agriculture is a compulsory subject for all students. Wood working, metal work, and technical drawing are encouraged for boys, and home economics is encouraged for girls. One of the biggest criticisms of secondary schools in Malawi is that they are too university-oriented and needs more technical skills taught. Most students immediately enter the workforce and need a different orientation. Therefore, Secondary schools do not produce as many graduates as the labor market demands. In fact, only one-fourth of Malawi's youth end up attending secondary school.

Public school system
The government established free primary education for all children in 1994, which increased attendance rates, according to UNICEF.  In 1994, the gross primary enrollment rate was 133.9 percent, and the net primary enrollment rate was 102.6 percent. In 1995, 62 percent of students entering primary school reached grade two, and 34 percent reached grade five. The dropout rate is higher among girls than boys.

Private school system
Private schools have risen in Malawi and offer an alternative to public schools. Private schools include school like tukombo private girls secondary school, Bedir IS, Phungu, Lilongwe Girls, Hossana private School and Sunnyside School. Some consolidates private schools are run by the Designated Schools Board.

Tukombo private girls secondary school established in 1998, run NY nkhatabay development trust.

The Bedir Foundation, founded in 2000, owns two schools: Bedir Star International school, Lilongwe and Bedir International school, Blantyre. Both use Cambridge International Examinations syllabus, as well as MANEB.

Charitable Foundation schools
Many independent schools have been set up as charitable foundations in Malawi with a specific targeted pupil:  

 The Jacaranda Foundation, founded by nanny Marie Da Silva, maintains the Jacaranda School. It is Malawi's only entirely free school for primary and secondary students. The vast majority of students of the Jacaranda School are orphaned by the HIV/AIDS pandemic, as featured on 2008 CNN Heroes.
 St Patricks academy & primary
 The Joyce Banda Foundation is a foundation that runs schools for primary and secondary schools in Malawi.
 The Raising Malawi foundation is in the process of building a school aimed at female education in Malawi.
 The Legson Kayira Primary School and Community Center
 The Youth of Malawi foundation has built a solar-powered, rainwater harvesting primary school in the village of Chimphamba, in the Mchinji district of rural Malawi.

University system

The university sector in Malawi is composed of four public universities and several private universities. No university in Malawi is included in either the Times Higher or QS World University Rankings. Malawi has among the lowest rates of participation in university education in the world, with less than 1% of college age people attending university in the country. There are some efforts to improve access to higher education, particularly for women, who are typically under-represented in Malawian institutions.

The public universities are (in order of founding):

University of Malawi

Malawi's first and largest tertiary educational institution is the University of Malawi. It was founded in 1964 and operates on several campuses.

Mzuzu University

Mzuzu University was founded in 1997 and is one of the principal universities of Malawi. The school is located in Mzuzu city in the northern region of the country.
Northern Malawi is a very poor place with kids all around playing and adults farming. Some kids help the adults with farming but most goes to school.

Lilongwe University of Agriculture and Natural Resources

Lilongwe University of Agriculture and Natural Resources is a university outside Lilongwe, Malawi. It was formed in 2011 by a merger between Bunda College of Agriculture of the University of Malawi and Natural Resources College (NRC).

The Malawi University of Science and Technology

The Malawi University of Science and Technology (MUST), sometimes referred to as the University of Southern Malawi, was established on 17 December 2012 by the Malawi University of Science and Technology Act No. 31 of 2012 as the fourth Public University in Malawi. It was officially opened in 2014 by Professor Peter Mutharika, LL.B(Hons), J.D.S.  It's situated in the prestigious shire highlands in Thyolo, Malawi. The seating capacity of this university is 3000 but can accommodate about twice that seating capacity. Evidently, this University will hugely contribute to the government of Malawi's efforts to widening access to higher education.

Once fully operational, the University will have the Malawi Institute of Technology, Ndata School of Climate & Earth Sciences, Academy of Medical Sciences and the Bingu School of Culture and Heritage. The Malawi Industrial Research and Technology Development Centre will be part of the MIT.

Private universities in Malawi include the following:

Central Christian University

Central Christian University (CCU) CCU is Research-Based Private-Not-Profit University dedicated to provide Open and Distance Learning programmes in Malawi

Catholic University of Malawi

The university is located in Montfort campus in Chiladzulu District in Malawi.  It was established in 2004 and opened in 2006, with faculties of social science and education. It now additionally offers economics, marketing, business administration, and accounting.

University fees recently increased sixfold to about £380 per year, more than double Malawi’s legal minimum wage.

Teaching and education profession
The Ministry of Education develops the curricula used in Malawi's schools and oversee teacher training. Teachers take both pedagogical and academic courses. Supervised practical teaching is expected before teaching independently. Most teachers begin as primary school teachers in a demonstration school adjacent to teacher training facilities. Later, block teaching is tried during which the teacher trainee tries teaching a class on their own for six weeks. Three types of lecturers educate potential teachers. Graduate teacher educators chair most departments, aided by diplomate and non-diplomate assistants.

Primary teachers
Malawi has four professional teaching Grades (PT) of primary school teachers. The PT4 teacher holds a Malawi School Certificate of Education (MSCE) which is four years of secondary school education, and a two-year Teachers Certificate. PT3 is obtained after going through interviews after serving for fours at PT4 Grade. PT2 and PT1 they are also obtained through interviews. However, PT2 is an administrative grade (Deputy Head teacher) while PT1 is reserved for the head teacher, primary education advisors and field supervisors.

Secondary teachers
Secondary school teachers are trained at the School of Education. This school awards three types of professional qualifications, which are: Diploma of Education, Bachelor of Education and the University Certificate of Education.

University  lecturers
Malawi citizens who serve as professors constitute 30 percent of the university's faculty. In 1977, a total of 87 of the 199 working faculty or 87 percent were expatriates. While 27 percent of the professoriat were from Malawi and a further 48 percent were pursuing advanced degrees abroad. There is a need both to upgrade or develop personnel currently serving as professors and to train many more Malawians to fill these posts.

Non-governmental organisations

Wungwero Book Foundation trains teacher librarians at the DAPP teacher training college. AYISE, a large non-governmental organization based in Blantyre, Malawi, provides education at its youth center and works with local schools.

Notable Malawian educators
 Joyce Banda - former President of Malawi, founder of the Joyce Banda Foundation
 Frank Chipasula - author, poet and educator
 Peter Mutharika - President of Malawi, professor of law, international law advisor
 Anjimile Oponyo - educator

Notable Malawian scholars
 Frank Chipasula - author, poet and educator
 William Kamkwamba - Malawian student who gained fame after building a windmill from spare parts

References

External links
 Ministry of Education of Malawi
 Education Statistics and Quality of Education in Malawi, Southern and Eastern Africa Consortium for Monitoring Educational Quality (SACMEQ)
 Malawi Education Foundation

 
Malawi